Swim Coots Mill is a tower mill at Catfield, Norfolk, England which has been conserved with some machinery remaining.

History

Swim Coots Mill was built in the early nineteenth century. It was marked on the 1838 Ordnance Survey map. The mill was working until at least the 1930s but was derelict by 1978. The mill has since been conserved, with the tower roofed over.

Description

Swim Coots mill is a two storey tower mill which formerly had a boat shaped cap winded by a fantail. It had four double Patent sails. It drove a  diameter scoopwheel housed internally. The mill also drove a single pair of millstones.

References

External links
Windmill World webpage on Swim Coots Mill.

Industrial buildings completed in the 19th century
Windmills of the Norfolk Broads
Tower mills in the United Kingdom
Grinding mills in the United Kingdom
Windpumps in the United Kingdom